Aase Berg (born 1967) is a Swedish poet and critic.

Aase Berg was among the founding members of the Stockholm Surrealist Group in 1986 and published an early book on their publishing company Surrealistförlaget in 1988. During the late 1990s she emerged as one of the most prominent young poets in Sweden and has since 1997 had several collections of poetry published by various branches of the Bonnier publishing house, the largest and most prestigious in Sweden. Aase Berg made her debut as a prose writer with a short story in the collection , published on Vertigo, the publishing company of Carl-Michael Edenborg, another member of the Stockholm surrealist group. Berg has also been editor of the literary journal Bonniers Litterära Magasin (commonly known as BLM), has contributed to the journal 90tal, later renamed 00tal, and is a critic for the newspaper Expressen.

Awards and honours
2013 Best Translated Book Award, shortlist, Transfer Fat

Selected publications
 (Stockholm : Bonnier Alba, 1997)
 (Stockholm : Bonnier, 1999)
 (Stockholm : Bonnier, 2002)
 (Stockholm: Bonnier, 2005)
 Remainland: Selected Poems of Aase Berg, translated by Johannes Göransson (Tuscaloosa: Action Books, 2005)
With Deer, translated by Johannes Göransson (Boston: Black Ocean, 2009)

References

External links
 Official site of The Surrealist Group in Stockholm
 An article about Aase Berg
http://www.actionbooks.org

1967 births
Living people
Swedish women writers
Swedish-language writers
Surrealist writers
Swedish surrealist artists
Women surrealist artists
Surrealist artists